Anemopaegma glaucum is a plant native to Caatinga and Cerrado vegetation in Brazil. This plant is cited in Flora Brasiliensis by Carl Friedrich Philipp von Martius.

References

External links
Anemopaegma glaucum photo
 Flora Brasiliensis: Anemopaegma glaucum 
 Flora Brasiliensis revisitada: Anemopaegma glaucum

glaucum
Flora of Brazil